Frank Twomey (born mid-1950s) is known as the man from children's television programme Bosco. His lesser known credits include other screen appearances and appearances on stage.

Twomey went on to appear on Bull Island, particularly as Mary O'Rourke, the then Minister for Public Enterprise.

Twomey later featured on the advice show Agony OAPs, with retired footballer Pat Spillane and retired politician Mary O'Rourke, whom he impersonated on Bull Island.

He is openly gay, though not while on Bosco, at which time he was illegal, "but it didn't stop me from being gay. It meant that I was careful and I was very discrete because I had a government job", he said later.

References

External links
 

1950s births
Living people
Irish impressionists (entertainers)
Irish male television actors
Irish gay actors
RTÉ people